Sandra Monterroso (born 1974) is a Guatemalan visual artist and designer. Art historian Virginia Pérez-Ratton writes about Monterroso's beginnings as a performance artist in Guatemala during 1999 and 2000. Alongside her were other Guatemalan female performers like Regina José Galindo, Maria Adela Díaz, and Jessica Lagunas. Recently Monterroso's work focuses not only in performance art, she works with different media as videoart, installations and mix media. Her work is related to power structures, gender issues and decolonial thinking. Her work is included in the Artist Pension Trust.

Education 
Monterroso studied Graphic Design at an undergraduate level at the Rafael Landívar University in Guatemala. She holds a Masters in Design Process from Universidad Popular Autónoma del Estado de Puebla (UPAEP). She is currently pursuing a PhD in Practice from The Academy of Fine Arts Vienna.

Career

Select Video Art

Select Performances

Exhibitions

Solo exhibitions
In 2011, Ernesto Calvo curated Monterroso's solo exhibition, Efectos Cruzados, in Galería Piegatto in Guatemala City. The exhibit was later on shown at El Museo de Arte San Salvador (MARTE) in 2013. In February 2014, the artist opened her solo show Actions to Abolish the Desire at the 9.99 Gallery.

Group exhibitions
In May 2009, Rosina Cazali and Joanne Bernstein presented Performing Localities, a series of lectures and videos on post-war Guatemalan artists including Monterroso at InIVA. On June 17, 2009, Monterroso joined other female artists from Guatemala and Bolivia for an event called Feminist Art-Action: Panorama of feminist contemporary Latin-American video-performance, which was held at the Centre Georges Pompidou and organized by le peuple qui manque.

In January 2014, Ciudad de la Imaginación, a contemporary art space in the western highlands of Guatemala, invited Monterroso to participate in the Estados de Excepción exhibition that traveled to Arte Actual in Quito, Ecuador. In 2014, Monterroso participated as a part of the Indigenous Voices project in the Montevideo Biennial: 500 Future Years, curated by Alfons Hug.  In 2015 Monterroso has been invited to participate in the Latin American Pavilion for the 56th Venice Biennale and in the 12th Havana Biennial.

Awards and Recognitions 
 2014: RD Foundation Vienna.
 2012: Juannio, 2nd place
 2011: Juannio, 3rd place
 2006: XV Bienal de Arte Paiz, First place
 2004: Inquieta Imagen - Museum of Contemporary Art and Design

Bibliography 
 Perez-Ratton, Virginia. "Central American Women Artist in a Global Age." Global Feminisms: New Directions in Contemporary Art. Ed. Maura Reilly and Linda Nochlin. 1st ed. Brooklyn: Merrell, 2007. 123-42. Print.

References

External links 
 
 
 
 
 
 
 
 
 
 

Performance artists
Guatemalan women artists
Feminist artists
1974 births
Guatemalan contemporary artists
Living people